Anandaraj (born May 15, 1959) is an Indian actor. He has acted in villain roles in several Tamil films and has appeared in over a two hundred films in different languages including Kannada, Telugu, Malayalam and Hindi.

Career

Anandaraj was born and brought up in Pondicherry. His father was a civil surgeon
. After schooling, he wanted his son to be a police officer, but Anandaraj wanted to try something different as he was fascinated with films. His family supported his dreams. He joined in M.G.R. Government Film and Television Training Institute, Chennai for a course. Kannada actor Shiva Rajkumar was his classmate.

Anandaraj was under the impression that offers would come his way, but later he had to struggle for an opportunity and finally started off with the 1988 film Oruvar Vaazhum Aalayam, starring Prabhu and Sivakumar, and later En Thangachi Padichava, directed by P. Vasu, gave him the much-needed break in all the four south Indian languages. He did Suresh Krissna’s Raja Kaiya Vacha (1990) with Prabhu, in which he essayed a positive role. However, he appeared with Vijayakanth and starred in several films together.

On playing the hero roles, Anand Raj mentioned: "When one gets popular being a villain, people around you always push you to take the next step and it was one of those phases when I took up offers to play the lead role". He went on to play lead roles in the films Palaivana Paravaigal, Kaaval Nilayam, Thambi Oorukku Puthusu, Government Mappillai, Pokkiri Thambi, Kizhakku Veluthathchu, David Uncle, En Rajangam, Puthiya Aatchi and My India. Even though directors offered him good scripts, the films just didn't work well at the box office. The huge popularity that Anandaraj gained during the late eighties elevated him to the status of hero and he and R. Sarathkumar together starred in a few action films. While Sarathkumar hit stardom, Anandaraj who was billed above him in their films together did not sustain his position and went back to playing small roles. He has acted as a villain alongside most of the top actors, like Balakrishna (Muddula Mavayya), Vijayakanth (Pulan Visaranai), Chiranjeevi (Gang Leader) Rajinikanth (Baashha), Mammootty (Makkal Aatchi), R. Sarathkumar (Suryavamsam) and Vijay (Pokkiri).

Many years later, Anandaraj made a sudden switch to comedy in Mundasupatti directed by Ramkumar released in 2014 that had audiences falling off their seats and there had been no looking back since then. Anandaraj has become a hot favorite of young directors who write quirky characters for him which he performs with his signature style that has gained him a huge fan following in the younger generation of movie goers.

Director Prabhu Deva offered Anandaraj the lead in the role and asked him not to react to anything, even though a baddie is expected to give exaggerated expressions. Prabhu Deva wanted Anandaraj to sport a certain look, so he underwent intense training for a year and lost about 12 kilos and fulfilled Prabhu Deva's expectation to get signed for Action Jackson (2014). He played a don in the film and his look was completely different from the one he had tried in the south, as he spots a lizard tattoo on his head.

He joined Vijay Sethupathi and Nayanthara starrer Naanum Rowdydhaan (2015). Though Anandaraj doesn't play the main antagonist role, his character will have shades of grey. In Maragadha Naanayam (2017), he plays a character called Twinkle Ramanathan. His other films include Katha Nayagan (2017), Sathya (2017) and Gulaebaghavali (2018). He's almost perfected the role of the comic villain. For the film Jackpot (2019), Anandaraj received Best comedian from Vikatan.  He played a role in Bigil (2019) has expressed his disappointment over the filmmaker for the way he approached his character in the film in post production.

Personal life

Anandaraj was born in Puducherry to a Mudaliar community and is the second son in the family of eight. He is married and has a daughter and a son.

Politics 
Actor Anandraj is loyal to Jayalalitha and has joined ADMK under her leadership. He supported BJP and stated that he will personally vote for the party in 2014. After Jayalalitha's death he quit ADMK. He later said Mudaliar community should vote for NOTA.

Filmography

References

Living people
Male actors from Puducherry
Male actors in Tamil cinema
People from Pondicherry
Male actors in Hindi cinema
Male actors in Malayalam cinema
Male actors in Telugu cinema
Male actors in Kannada cinema
Indian male film actors
20th-century Indian male actors
21st-century Indian male actors
1959 births
M.G.R. Government Film and Television Training Institute alumni